Karar Samedul Islam (born July 15, 1981) is a Bangladeshi former swimmer, who specialized in breaststroke events. Islam competed only in the men's 100 m breaststroke at the 2000 Summer Olympics in Sydney. He received a Universality place from FINA, in an entry time of 1:09.51. He challenged six other swimmers in heat two, including two-time Olympians Juan José Madrigal of Costa Rica and Jean Luc Razakarivony of Madagascar. With one swimmer casting out of the race for a no false-start rule, Islam rounded out the field to last place in 1:14.93, almost ten seconds farther behind leader Madrigal. Islam failed to advance into the semifinals, as he placed sixty-fourth overall on the first day of prelims.

References

External links
 

1981 births
Living people
Bangladeshi male swimmers
Olympic swimmers of Bangladesh
Swimmers at the 2000 Summer Olympics
Male breaststroke swimmers
Sportspeople from Dhaka
South Asian Games gold medalists for Bangladesh
South Asian Games bronze medalists for Bangladesh
South Asian Games medalists in swimming